De Umbris Idearum (Latin for "On the Shadows of Ideas") is a book written in 1582 by Italian Dominican friar and cosmological theorist Giordano Bruno. In this book, he proposes a system integrating mnemonics, Ficinian psychology, and hermetic magic. It is the first book he wrote covering the subject of memory, a topic on which he would focus the rest of his works.

Notes

Bibliography 
 Yates, Frances A., "Giordano Bruno and the Hermetic Tradition" (1964).

External links 
 Twilit Grotto—Esoteric Archives. Giordano Bruno's De Umbris Idearum. Digital edition by Joseph H. Peterson, 1997. (Latin, full text).

Books by Giordano Bruno
Philosophy books
Grimoires